Alexander or Alex Santos may refer to:

Alex Santos (newscaster) (born 1970), Filipino newscaster and reporter
Alexandro da Silva Santos, Brazilian striker
Alexandre José Maria dos Santos (1924–2021), Mozambican Roman Catholic cardinal
Alessandro Santos (born 1977), Brazilian-born Japanese footballer, known as Alex
Alex dos Santos (footballer) (born 1981), Brazilian football defender
Alex Santos (footballer) (born 1993), Brazilian footballer
Alex Santos (baseball)